Raja Chanwarsen was an Indian king of the Chanwar Dynasty. He was belongs to the Suryavansh according  to Some historians believe that there is a Chanwar dynasty in India.  It is believed that this dynasty belonged to Suryavanshi Kshatriya clan.  Chanvravati city in Gujarat used to be the majestic capital of this dynasty.  Chanvarsen used to rule here.  He also had many sons.  Whose names were Kamalsen, Brahmasen, Ratisen etc.  It is said that after defeating the Sultan of Ghazni, Bappa Rawal made the chieftain of the Chanwar dynasty the ruler there.  This dynasty has been described in detail in his book "History of Rajasthan" written by Colonel Tad sir. It is believed that when Turks invaded India.  In that period, the rule of this dynasty was in the western part of India and its majestic king was Chanvarsen.  The royal family of this Kshatriya dynasty had matrimonial relations with the Bappa Rawal dynasty.  The famous king of that time, Rana Sanga and his wife Jhali Rani, made Saint Raidasji, who belonged to the Chanwar dynasty, as their guru and gave him the title of Rajguru of their Mewar.

References 

Asian kings
Solar dynasty